The Genius of Charles Darwin is a three-part television documentary, written and presented by evolutionary biologist Richard Dawkins.

It was first shown in August 2008 on Channel 4. It won Best TV Documentary Series 2008 at the British Broadcast Awards in January 2009.

Part 1: Life, Darwin & Everything
In the first episode Richard Dawkins explains the basic mechanisms of natural selection, and tells the story of how Charles Darwin developed his theory.

He teaches a year 11 science class about evolution, which many of the students are reluctant to accept. He then takes them to the Jurassic Coast in Dorset to search for fossils, hoping that the students can see some of the evidence for themselves.

Dawkins also visits the place of his birth, Nairobi, where he interviews a prostitute who seems to have a genetic immunity to HIV, and talks to microbiologist Larry Gelmon. He goes on to predict that genetic immunity is a trait that will become more prevalent in the community over time.

Part 2: The Fifth Ape
In the second episode Richard Dawkins deals with some of the philosophical and social ramifications of the theory of evolution.

Dawkins starts out in Kenya, speaking with palaeontologist Richard Leakey. He then visits Christ is the Answer Ministries, Kenya's largest Pentecostal church, to interview Bishop Bonifes Adoyo. Adoyo has led the movement to press the National Museums of Kenya to sideline its collection of hominid bones pointing to man's evolution from ape to human. The collection includes the Turkana Boy discovered by Kamoya Kimeu, a member of a team led by Richard Leakey in 1984.

Dawkins discusses social Darwinism and eugenics, explaining how these are not versions of natural selection, and that "Darwin has been wrongly tainted".

He then meets with evolutionary psychologist Steven Pinker to discuss how morals can be compatible with natural selection. He goes on to explaining sexual selection, with peafowls as an example. To find out whether sexual selection plays a role for altruism and kindness among humans, he visits women who are looking for sperm donors, as well as a sperm bank manager. Dawkins also explains kin selection and selfish genes.

Dawkins talks with Dutch  primatologist and ethologist Frans de Waal about empathy among chimpanzees.

Part 3: God Strikes Back
In the third and final episode, Dawkins explains why Darwin's theory is one of history's most controversial ideas.

Dawkins uses this episode to discuss the opposition that evolution has experienced since it was first discovered. He starts by approaching various anti-evolutionists, ranging from John Mackay from Creation Research, Wendy Wright, President of Concerned Women for America, to English school teacher Nick Cowen. In order to address concerns they bring up, he shows the evidence for evolution, including fossil and DNA evidence. He also talks to the teachers of the science students who he taught during the first episode, asking them why they aren't adequately teaching the ideas of science properly, allowing instead their students to believe that truth is personal and that science is merely a point of view.

Dawkins last interview is with the philosopher Daniel Dennett. They discuss whether Darwinism deprives people of consolation. 

Dawkins also describes Darwin's personal loss of faith, based not only on the natural mechanisms he saw, but also on the cruelty in the world which seemed to deny a loving God, in particular the loss of his daughter Annie. While Dawkins does address the bleakness of the Darwinian view, he spends the last part of this episode describing how Darwin and he himself address it, ending by saying:

References

External links

British television documentaries
Channel 4 documentary series
Documentary films about nature
Works by Richard Dawkins
2008 British television series debuts
2008 British television series endings
Charles Darwin bicentenary
Scientific skepticism mass media
Cultural depictions of Charles Darwin
Documentary television shows about evolution